Naṣru (Hatran Aramaic: 𐣭𐣱𐣣𐣥) was a local governor at Hatra (an ancient town in the North of modern Iraq). He is attested by at least in 34 inscriptions found in the Hatra. Three of the inscriptions are dated (between AD 128/29 and AD 137/38). A fourth one dates most likely after he died and gives the year 176/177 BC. The inscription dated to year AD 137/138 reports the building of the city wall and a city gate.

Naṣru carried the enigmatic title mry' , which might translate as master, governor or administrator. He was the son of Nashrihab and father of Wolgash and Sanatruq I.

Literature 
Michael Sommer: Hatra. Geschichte und Kultur einer Karawanenstadt im römisch-parthischen Mesopotamien. von Zabern, Mainz 2003, p. 26-27.

2nd-century Arabs
Hatra
2nd-century monarchs in the Middle East